Serge Yohoua (born 22 March 1989) is an Ivorian-German footballer who played in the 3. Liga for Rot-Weiss Erfurt.

External links

1989 births
Living people
Ivorian footballers
German footballers
German people of Ivorian descent
FC Ingolstadt 04 players
FC Rot-Weiß Erfurt players
FC Viktoria Köln players
3. Liga players
Association football forwards
FC Ingolstadt 04 II players